Salisbury Playhouse is a theatre in the English city of Salisbury, Wiltshire. It was built in 1976 and comprises the 517-seat Main House and the 149-seat Salberg, a rehearsal room and a community & education space. It is part of Arts Council England's National Portfolio of Organisations, and also receives regular funding from Wiltshire Council and Salisbury City Council.

Overview 
Plays in the Main House are often own or co-produced work, of which there are between eight and ten a year. The Playhouse also houses touring productions and a variety of events as part of the Salisbury International Arts Festival.

The Studio programme is the focus for the theatre’s work for and with young people, which includes toured-in work, work from its Youth Theatre called Stage '65, and workshop productions.

The Playhouse’s Tesco Community & Education Space and Rehearsal Room opened in July 2007.

In 2018, the charity which runs the theatre amalgamated with Salisbury Arts Centre and Salisbury International Arts Festival and was renamed Wiltshire Creative.

Personnel 
The Artistic Director is Gareth Machin, who was appointed in October 2011, and the Executive Director is Sebastian Warrack, appointed October 2012.

, the Board of Trustees are Tim Crarer (Chairman), Doric Bossom, Sarah Butcher, Andy Bridewell, Tom Clay, Nick Frankfort, Rosemary Macdonald, Niall Murphy, John Perry, Rupert Sebag-Montefiore and Susan Shaw.

Productions

2008
 The Herbal Bed by Peter Whelan
 People at Sea by J.B. Priestly
 Taming the Tempest devised and directed by Mark Powell
 Touched by Stephen Lowe
 What the Butler Saw by Joe Orton
 Oliver! A Stage ’65 Youth Theatre Production
 Drowning on Dry Land by Alan Ayckbourn
 A Taste of Honey by Shelagh Delaney
 A Number by Caryl Churchill
 A Month in the Country by J.L. Carr, adapted by Philip Wilson. Premiere
 Let’s Face The Music and Dance a celebration of Irving Berlin
 Dick Whittington and his Cat by Mark Clements
 Our Country’s Good by Timberlake Wertenbaker (Stage ’65 Youth Theatre)

2009
 Estelle Bright by Sarah Tullamore and Frederic Baptiste
 The Winslow Boy by Terence Rattigan
 The Real Thing by Tom Stoppard
 Restoration by Rose Tremain, adapted by Matthew Francis. World premiere
 Faith Healer by Brian Friel
 The Importance of Being Earnest by Oscar Wilde
 The Wizard of Oz A Stage ’65 Youth Theatre Production
 The Lady in the Van by Alan Bennett
 Blackbird by David Harrower
 Romeo and Juliet: Unzipped, devised and directed by Mark Powell
 After Miss Julie, a version of Strindberg’s Miss Julie by Patrick Marber
 Arsenic and Old Lace by Joseph Kesselring
 Cinderella by Mark Clements, with original songs by Paul Herbert
 The Way You Look Tonight, a celebration of Jerome Kern

2010
 With a Song in My Heart a celebration of Rodgers and Hart
 Aladdin by Mark Clements, with original songs by Paul Herbert
 The Picture by Philip Massinger
 Death and the Maiden by Ariel Dorfman
 A Voyage Round My Father by John Mortimer
 Peter Pan by J. M. Barrie
 Les liaisons dangereuses by Christopher Hampton
 Toro! Toro! by Michael Morpurgo, adapted by Simon Reade (world premiere)
 Low Pay? Don't Pay by Dario Fo, translated by Joseph Farrell
 The Glass Menagerie by Tennessee Williams, co produced with Shared Experience
 Private Lives by Noël Coward
 The Little Mermaid and Other Tales, devised by Stage ’65 Youth Theatre, based on original stories by Hans Christian Andersen

2011
 The Constant Wife by W. Somerset Maugham
 The Game of Love and Chance by Pierre Marivaux, translated by Neil Bartlett
 The Country by Martin Crimp
 Guys and Dolls, a co-production with Clwyd Theatr Cymru and New Wolsey Theatre Ipswich
 Around the World in 80 Days adapted by Phil Wilmott from the novel by Jules Verne (Stage '65 Youth Theatre)
 The Women of Troy by Euripides (Stage '65 Youth Theatre)

References

External links

Theatres in Wiltshire
Buildings and structures in Salisbury
Theatres completed in 1976